Groomer Has It is an American reality television broadcast on Animal Planet. It features a competition between twelve of America's best dog groomers to see who is the best groomer in America. The prize includes $50,000 and a "mobile grooming salon." The show is hosted by Jai Rodriguez of Queer Eye for the Straight Guy fame. The winner of the first season was Artist Knox, while the second groomer of the year is Huber Pineda.

Show format
Twelve dog groomers enter the competition in to the Dog House, where they must live and compete together. Every week there is a Quick Sniff Challenge, which involves the groomers doing a miscellaneous task which could be helpful to their grooming career. The winner of this challenge gets a Leg Up in the Elimination Challenge, a grooming challenge often related to the Quick Sniff Challenge. The winner of the Elimination Challenge gets a Leg Up for the next Quick Sniff Challenge (in season 1), and a groomer who performed below the standard for the competition is eliminated from the game.

Personnel
Host Jai Rodriguez, TV personality/Queer Eye for the Straight Guy
Nemo the Messenger Dog, Jai's Yorkie
Judge Dr. Karen Halligan, veterinarian
Judge Xavier Santiago, award-winning dog handler
Judge Joey Villani, professional dog groomer

Season 1

Episodes
Ep. 1  First Things First (originally aired April 12, 2008)
Ep. 2  Herd Mentality (originally aired April 19, 2008)
Ep. 3  Ruff Customers (originally aired April 26, 2008)
Ep. 4  The Fashion Show (originally aired May 3, 2008)
Ep. 5  Meowza (originally aired May 10, 2008)
Ep. 6  Chow Time (originally aired May 17, 2008)
Ep. 7  On the Cover (originally aired May 24, 2008)
Ep. 8  Knowing Your Dog (originally aired May 31, 2008)
Ep. 9  Rags to Riches (originally aired June 7, 2008)
Ep. 10 House Calls (originally aired June 14, 2008)
Ep. 11 Down to Business (originally aired June 21, 2008)
Ep. 12 Recap Episode (originally aired June 28, 2008)
Ep. 13 The Championship Dog Show (originally aired June 28, 2008)

Groomer progress

 (WINNER) The groomer won the series and was crowned Groomer of the Year.
 (WIN) The groomer won that episode's Elimination Challenge.
 (HIGH) The groomer was selected as one of the top entries in the Elimination Challenge, but did not win.
 (LOW) The groomer was selected as one of the bottom entries in the Elimination Challenge, but was not eliminated.
 (OUT) The groomer lost that week's Elimination Challenge and was out of the competition.
 (IN) The groomer neither won or lost that week's Elimination Challenge. They also were not up to be eliminated.
 (SAFE) The groomer could have been eliminated but there were unusual circumstances.
In episode 4 groomers worked in teams of 3. The bottom 3 groomers voted off their own teammate, and the judges would only choose who left if there was a tie.
In episode 7 there was no Quick Sniff Challenge. Instead, the groomers had an Elimination Challenge where they had to choose a dog from the dog park, groom it, and then have a photo shoot for Groomer to Groomer Magazine.
In episode 9 there was no Quick Sniff Challenge. Instead, the groomers had to groom dogs from The Lange Foundation dog shelter and adopt them out.
Originally, the elimination challenge was to select one dog out of four from The Lange Foundation's Los Angeles dog shelter and adopt it out.  The one that was last in finding a home for their dog would be sent home.  After the adoption fair was over it was revealed that no one would be going home.
Episode 12 was a recap episode, showing never before seen clips and catching up anyone who hadn't seen the season.
In Episode 13 there was no Quick Sniff Challenge. Instead, the groomers had to groom 8 dogs in less than 12 hours, 7 from each regular show group and one "mutt" to showcase their creative ability.

Season 2

Episodes
Ep. 1 Welcome to the Neighborhood (originally aired April 11, 2009)
Ep. 2 What's Wrong With This Picture (originally aired April 18, 2009)
Ep. 3 Deep Breaths (originally aired April 25, 2009)
Ep. 4 The Cutting Edge (originally aired May 2, 2009)
Ep. 5 Top Knots (originally aired May 10, 2009)
Ep. 6 Old Dog, New Tricks (originally aired May 17, 2009)
Ep. 7 Piggies (originally aired May 24, 2009)
Ep. 8 Rescue Me (originally aired May 30, 2009)
Ep. 9 Look-a-Likes (originally aired June 6, 2009)
Ep. 10 Green on the Go (originally aired June 13, 2009)
Ep. 11 Cut! (originally aired June 20, 2009)
Ep. 12 Groomers Unleashed (June 27, 2009)
Ep. 13 Finale (originally aired June 27, 2009)

Groomer progress

 (WINNER) The groomer won the series and was crowned Groomer of the Year.
 (WIN) The groomer won that episode's Elimination Challenge.
 (HIGH) The groomer was selected as one of the top entries in the Elimination Challenge, but did not win.
 (LOW) The groomer was selected as one of the bottom entries in the Elimination Challenge, but was not eliminated.
 (OUT) The groomer lost that week's Elimination Challenge and was out of the competition.
 (IN) The groomer neither won or lost that week's Elimination Challenge. They also were not up to be eliminated.
 (SAFE) The groomer may have been eliminated except there were unusual circumstances.
 The judges said that if Bill did not have immunity (which he won from the Quick Sniff Challenge) he would have been eliminated.
 Bill was called before Huber, who then thought he was going home. It was then revealed that he was being "rescued" by the judges liked they had rescued the dogs at the animal shelter by helping them find new homes.
 Danielle was originally in the bottom two, but Lisa used her save and switched Danielle with Huber.

Challenges

References

External links

Animal Planet original programming
2000s American reality television series
2008 American television series debuts
Television shows about dogs